Timothy Floyd Spooneybarger (born October 21, 1979) is a retired Major League Baseball relief pitcher. He bats and throws right-handed.

Baseball career

Spooneybarger was drafted by the Atlanta Braves in the 29th round of the 1998 Major League Baseball draft and spent three seasons in the minors, where he compiled an outstanding record of 11 wins, 2 losses and 16 saves with a 1.79 ERA. He made his major league debut with the Braves on September 5, . Spooneybarger spent most of the  season in the majors recording a 2.63 ERA in 51 games for the Braves. On November 18, 2002, Spooneybarger was traded to the Florida Marlins along with minor league pitcher Ryan Baker for Mike Hampton.

He started  with the Marlins, appearing in 33 games before going on the disabled list with elbow tendinitis; the team went on to win the 2003 World Series. Before beginning a rehabilitation assignment, he was forced to have Tommy John surgery and miss the entire  season. On July 20, while rehabilitating, he left the game due to pain and later learned he would have to undergo Tommy John surgery for a second time. The Marlins released him after the 2005 season and Spooneybarger would be out of professional baseball for the next two years.

In May , he signed with the Baltimore Orioles and played for the team's Low-A affiliate the Aberdeen IronBirds. He became a free agent at the end of the season.

Spooneybarger plays in a rock band called Madder Ink with former Marlins teammate A. J. Burnett. The group is so named because Burnett and Spooneybarger both sport many tattoos.

External links

 Baseball America
 KFFL

1979 births
Living people
Major League Baseball pitchers
Baseball players from San Diego
Atlanta Braves players
Florida Marlins players
Danville Braves players
Macon Braves players
Myrtle Beach Pelicans players
Greenville Braves players
Richmond Braves players
Aberdeen IronBirds players